Saruzan-e Pain (also Romanized as Sārūzan-e Pā’īn and Sārūzan Pā’īn; also known as Sārzūn-e Pā’īn) is a village in Lajran Rural District, in the Central District of Garmsar County, Semnan Province, Iran. At the 2006 census, its population was 24 from 6 families.

References 

Populated places in Garmsar County